This is the electoral history of John Conyers, the most senior member of the United States House of Representatives from 2015 to 2017. He was first elected in 1964, and re-elected in every subsequent election.

Almanac
{| class="wikitable"  style="text-align:center; width:94%; margin:auto;"
|- style="background:#ccc;"
! colspan="6" style="background:#cff;"|United States Congressional service
|-
! Dates
! Congress
! Chamber
! Majority
! President
! District
|-
|1965–1967
|89th
|rowspan=15 |U.S. House
|rowspan=15 |Democratic
|rowspan=2 |Lyndon Johnson
|rowspan=14 style="background:white;" |District 1
|-
|1967–1969
|90th
|-
|1969–1971
|91st
|rowspan=2  |Richard Nixon
|-
|1971–1973
|92nd
|-
|1973–1975
|93rd
| |Richard NixonGerald Ford
|-
|1975–1977
|94th
| |Gerald Ford
|-
|1977–1979
|95th
|rowspan=2 |Jimmy Carter
|-
|1979–1981
|96th
|-
|1981–1983
|97th
|rowspan=4  |Ronald Reagan
|-
|1983–1985
|98th
|-
|1985–1987
|99th
|-
|1987–1989
|100th
|-
|1989–1991
|101st
|rowspan=2  |George H. W. Bush
|-
|1991–1993
|102nd
|-
|1993–1995
|103rd
|rowspan=4  |Bill Clinton
|rowspan=10 style="background:white;" |District 14
|-
|1995–1997
|104th
|rowspan=6 |U.S. House
|rowspan=6 |Republican
|-
|1997–1999
|105th
|-
|1999–2001
|106th
|-
|2001–2003
|107th
|rowspan=4  |George W. Bush
|-
|2003–2005
|108th
|-
|2005–2007
|109th
|-
|2007–2009
|110th
|rowspan=2 |U.S. House
|rowspan=2 |Democratic
|-
|2009–2011
|111th
|rowspan=4  |Barack Obama
|-
|2011–2013
|112th
|rowspan=4 |U.S. House
|rowspan=4 |Republican
|-
|2013–2015
|113th
|rowspan=3 style="background:white;" |District 13
|-
|2015–2017
|114th
|-
|2017
|115th
|Donald Trump

Election results

|+ : Results 1964–1990
! Year
!
! Democrat
! Votes
! %
!
! Republican
! Votes
! %
!
! Third Party
! Party
! Votes
! %
!
! Third Party
! Party
! Votes
! %
!
! Third Party
! Party
! Votes
! %
|-
|1964
||
| |John Conyers
| |138,589
| |84%
|
| |Robert Blackwell
| |25,735
| |16%
|
||Milton Henry
||Freedom Now
||1,504
||1%
|
|
|
|
|
|
|
|
|
|
|-
|1966
||
| |John Conyers
| |89,808
| |84%
|
| |Reecha Ross
| |16,853
| |16%
|
|
|
|
|
|
|
|
|
|
|
|
|
|
|
|-
|1968
||
| |John Conyers
| |127,847
| |100%
|
| |No candidate
| |
| |
|
|
|
|
|
|
|
|
|
|
|
|
|
|
|
|-
|1970
||
| |John Conyers
| |93,075
| |88%
|
| |Howard Johnson
| |11,876
| |11%
|
|! style="background:#aa0000; "|Jacqueline Rice
|! style="background:#aa0000; "|Socialist Workers
|! style="background:#aa0000; " align="right"|617
|! style="background:#aa0000; " align="right"|1%
|
|
|
|
|
|
|
|
|
|
|-
|1972
||
| |John Conyers
| |131,353
| |88%
|
| |Walter Girardot
| |16,096
| |11%
|
| |Nina Hubbard
| |American Independent
| |817
| |1%
|
|! style="background:#aa0000; "|Maceo Dixon
|! style="background:#aa0000; "|Socialist Workers
|! style="background:#aa0000; " align="right"|337
|! style="background:#aa0000; " align="right"|0%
|
|
|
|
|
|-
|1974
||
| |John Conyers
| |97,620
| |91%
|
| |Walter Girardot
| |9,358
| |9%
|
|! style="background:#aa0000; "|Hattie McCutcheon
|! style="background:#aa0000; "|Socialist Workers
|! style="background:#aa0000; " align="right"|419
|! style="background:#aa0000; " align="right"|0%
|
||Lewis Steinhardt
||U.S. Labor
||176
||0%
|
|
|
|
|
|-
|1976
||
| |John Conyers
| |126,161
| |92%
|
| |Isaac Hood
| |8,927
| |7%
|
| |Hector McGregor
| |American Independent
| align="right" |727
| align="right" |1%
|
|! style="background:#aa0000; "|B.R. Washington
|! style="background:#aa0000; "|Socialist Workers
|! style="background:#aa0000; " align="right"|306
|! style="background:#aa0000; " align="right"|0%
|
| |Thomas Jones
| |Libertarian
| |245
| |0%
|-
|1978
||
| |John Conyers
| |89,646
| |93%
|
| |Robert Arnold
| |6,878
| |7%
|
|
|
|
|
|
|
|
|
|
|
|
|
|
|
|-
|1980
||
| |John Conyers
| |123,286
| |95%
|
| |William Bell
| |6,244
| |5%
|
| |Thomas Jones
| |Libertarian
| |699
| |1%
|
|
|
|
|
|
|
|
|
|
|-
|1982
||
| |John Conyers
| |125,517
| |97%
|
| |No candidate
| |
| |
|
| |Bill Krebaum
| |Libertarian
| |3,188
| |2%
|
|! style="background:#FF3300; "|Eddie Benjamin
|! style="background:#FF3300; "|Workers League
|! style="background:#FF3300; "|1,140
|! style="background:#FF3300; "|1%
|
|
|
|
|
|-
|1984
||
| |John Conyers
| |152,432
| |89%
|
| |Edward Mack
| |17,393
| |10%
|
|! style="background:#aa0000; "|Andrew Pulley
|! style="background:#aa0000; "|Socialist Workers
|! style="background:#aa0000; " align="right"|685
|! style="background:#aa0000; " align="right"|0%
|
|
|
|
|
|
|
|
|
|
|-
|1986
||
| |John Conyers
| |94,307
| |89%
|
| |Bill Ashe
| |10,407
| |10%
|
| |Peter Bowen
| |Independent
| align="right" |539
| align="right" |1%
|
| |Andrew Pulley
| |Independent
| align="right" |529
| align="right" |1%
|
|
|
|
|
|-
|1988
||
| |John Conyers
| |127,800
| |91%
|
| |Bill Ashe
| |10,979
| |8%
|
| |Jonathan Flint
| |Libertarian
| |744
| |1%
|
|! style="background:#FF7796 "|Sam Johnson
|! style="background:#FF7796 "|Workers Against Concessions
|! style="background:#FF7796 "|615
|! style="background:#FF7796 "|0%
|
|
|
|
|-
|1990
||
| |John Conyers
| |76,556
| |89%
|
| |Ray Shoulders
| |7,298
| |9%
|
| |Robert Mays
| |NPA
| align="right" |1,134
| align="right" |1%
|
| |Jonathan Flint
| |Libertarian
| |764
| |1%
|
|
|
|
|

|+ : Results 1992–2010
! Year
!
! Democrat
! Votes
! %
!
! Republican
! Votes
! %
!
! Third Party
! Party
! Votes
! %
!
! Third Party
! Party
! Votes
! %
!
! Third Party
! Party
! Votes
! %
|-
|1992
||
| |John Conyers
| |165,496
| |82%
|
| |John Gordon
| |32,036
| |16%
|
|! style="background:#00bfff; "|Richard Miller
|! style="background:#00bfff; "|Natural Law
|! style="background:#00bfff; "|2,043
|! style="background:#00bfff; "|1%
|
|! style="background:#FF3300 "|D'Artagnan Collier
|! style="background:#FF3300 "|Workers League
|! style="background:#FF3300 "|1,296
|! style="background:#FF3300 "|1%
|
|
|
|
|
|-
|1994
||
| |John Conyers
| |128,463
| |81%
|
| |Richard Fournier
| |26,215
| |17%
|
|! style="background:#00bfff; "|Richard Miller
|! style="background:#00bfff; "|Natural Law
|! style="background:#00bfff; "|2,953
|! style="background:#00bfff; "|2%
|
|
|
|
|
|
|
|
|
|
|-
|1996
||
| |John Conyers
| |157,722
| |85%
|
| |William Ashe
| |22,152
| |12%
|
| |Scott Boman
| |Libertarian
| |2,953
| |2%
|
|! style="background:#00bfff; "|Richard Miller
|! style="background:#00bfff; "|Natural Law
|! style="background:#00bfff; "|736
|! style="background:#00bfff; "|0%
|
| |Willie Reid
| |NPA
| align="right" |717
| align="right" |0% 
|-
|1998
||
| |John Conyers
| |126,321
| |87%
|
| |Vendella Collins
| |16,140
| |11%
|
| |Michael Freyman
| |Libertarian
| |1,764
| |1%
|
|! style="background:#00bfff; "|Richard Miller
|! style="background:#00bfff; "|Natural Law
|! style="background:#00bfff; "|1,080
|! style="background:#00bfff; "|1%
|
|
|
|
|
|-
|2000
||
| |John Conyers
| |168,982
| |89%
|
| |William Ashe
| |17,582
| |9%
|
| |Constance Catalfio
| |Libertarian
| |2,113
| |1%
|
|! style="background:#00bfff; "|Richard Miller
|! style="background:#00bfff; "|Natural Law
|! style="background:#00bfff; "|1,030
|! style="background:#00bfff; "|1%
|
|
|
|
|
|-
|2002
||
| |John Conyers
| |145,285
| |83%
|
| |	Dave Stone
| |26,544
| |15%
|
| |Francis Schorr
| |Libertarian
| align="right" |1,532
| align="right" |1%
|
| |John Litle
| |Green
| |1,247
| |1%
|
|
|
|
|
|-
|2004
||
| |John Conyers
| |213,681
| |84%
|
| |Veronica Pedraza
| |35,089
| |14%
|
| |Michael Donahue
| |Libertarian
| |2,278
| |1%
|
| |Lisa Weltman
| |Green
| |2,224
| |1%
|
| |Wilbert Sears
| |U.S. Taxpayers
| |1,307
| |1%
|-
|2006
||
| |John Conyers
| |158,755
| |85%
|
| |Chad Miles
| |27,367
| |15%
|
|
|
|
|
|
|
|
|
|
|
|
|
|
|
|-
|2008
||
| |John Conyers
| |227,841
| |92%
|
| |No candidate
| |
| |
|
| |Richard Secula
| |Libertarian
| |10,732
| |4%
|
| |Clyde Shabazz
| |Green
| |8,015
| |3%
|
|
|
|
|
|-
|2010
||
| |John Conyers
| |115,511
| |77%
|
| |Don Ukrainec
| |29,902
| |20%
|
| |Marc Sosnowski
| |U.S. Taxpayers
| |3,206
| |2%
|
| |Richard Secula
| |Libertarian
| |1,859
| |1%
|
|
|
|
|

|+ : Results 2012–2016
! Year
!
! Democrat
! Votes
! %
!
! Republican
! Votes
! %
!
! Third Party
! Party
! Votes
! %
!
! Third Party
! Party
! Votes
! %
!
|-
|2012
||
| |John Conyers
| |235,336
| |83%
|
| |Harry Sawicki
| |38,769
| |14%
|
| |Chris Sharer
| |Libertarian
| |6,076
| |2%
|
| |Martin Gray
| |U.S. Taxpayers
| |4,089
| |1%
|
|-
|2014
||
| |John Conyers
| |132,710
| |79%
|
| |Jeff Gorman
| |27,234
| |16%
|
| |Chris Sharer
| |Libertarian
| |3,537
| |2%
|
| |Sam Johnson
| |NPA
| |3,466
| |2%
|
|-
|2016
||
| |John Conyers
| |198,771
| |77%
|
| |Jeff Gorman
| |40,541
| |15%
|
| |Tiffany Hayden
| |Libertarian
| |9,648
| |3%
|
| |Sam Johnson
| |Working Class
| |8,835
| |3%
|

References

Conyers, John